Amina Temitope Ajayi (aka Mama Diaspora) is a US-based Nigerian business consultant who is an accountant by training, a social entrepreneur and an ardent community activist. Temitope Ajayi was the former President of All Nigerian American Congress (ANAC). Her efforts and continued advocacy on the Nigerian Diaspora issues have earned her in the media the moniker "Mama Diaspora".
Chief Ajayi is well known for promoting women empowerment and poverty eradication in Africa through Agri-business. Through the Arkansas-Nigeria investment forum and other bilateral economic forums in the US, Chief Ajayi's tenacity and genuineness have been very instrumental in convincing and attracting a lot of key investors in the agri-business from the US to Nigeria. She is the Founder/CEO of the Nigerian American Agricultural Empowerment Program (NAAEP), which engages in the Agricultural empowerment of farmers, women and young Adults in Nigeria in order to increase foods sufficiency and sustainable employment for women and youths in the agricultural sector. NAAEP has been a grassroots organization that trains and empowers farmers in mechanized farming system, while facilitating business loans, accessibility to farm implements, and the harvesting and marketing of their end product both locally and internationally. 
In 2010, Chief Ajayi called on the Federal Government of Nigeria to reduce the interest rates on loans to farmers in order to boost the agricultural sector and to alleviate poverty in the country. Chief Temitope Ajayi is an Ambassador of Goodwill for the State of Arkansas and Maryland, USA. Chief Ms. Ajayi was a distinguished delegate at the past 2014 Nigeria's National Conference where she represented the National Council of Women Societies (NCWS) in Nigeria and served in the Confab's Committee on Agriculture. Chief Temitope Ajayi in her address at the Annual Meeting of the World Bank Group and International Monetary Fund, informed delegates that “Women are the engine of the private sector, women run the economy of any nation - because they are more into commerce than their male counterpart, the power of any currency is in their ability to meet the demand and supply”.

Early life
Amina Temitope Labinjo is the daughter of late Pa Hector Labinjo and Mrs. Elizabeth Labinjo of Ita Garawu in Lagos Island of Lagos State, Nigeria.

Career in politics

From 1991–1993, Chief Ms. Temitope Ajayi was appointed as the Special Assistant to the Deputy Governor of Lagos State, Her Excellency Alhaja Sinatu Aderoju Ojukutu. Ms. Ajayi played an active role in the Better Life for Rural Women project sponsored by the then First Lady of Nigeria, Maryam Babangida and was a delegate for the International Women's Conference held in Morocco and London. After horrific experience during the oppressive military regime in Nigeria, Chief Ajayi migrated to the United States of America in 1996 and, since then devoted her life to doing business that would serve her Nigerian community both in the US and Nigeria. After a brief self-imposed exile in the US, Chief Ajayi returned to Nigeria to revolutionize agriculture with the intention of helping in the eradication of poverty in the country.

Chief Ajayi was the former National Coordinator of Goodluck Support Group (GSG) USA. She congratulated Muhammadu Buhari, GCFR, who is now the current President of the Federal Republic of Nigeria for his doggedness in winning the 2015 presidential election; and also praised the former president, Mr. Goodluck Jonathan for his extraordinary statesmanship, godliness and courage to become the first ever incumbent Head of State in Nigeria to lose an election and wholeheartedly accepted defeat peacefully to prevent post election violence and crisis in Nigeria  As a Community Activist, Chief Ajai has been lobbying the Nigerian federal government on behalf of all the Nigerians living in the diaspora in such areas as granting voting rights and approving housing scheme project for the diasporas.

Philanthropy 

Her philanthropic goodwill gestures started when she established a Fashion/Technical school for underprivileged students in Ibadan, Nigeria in 1980–1985.

Chief Ajayi later on championed and advocated for One Million Goodluck Housing Programme for the Diasporas in collaboration with the Federal Mortgage Bank of Nigeria under the DIASPORA HOUSING LOAN SCHEME. 
With the recent passing of the Bill establishing the Diaspora Commission, Chief Ajayi called on President Muhammadu Buhari to appoint credible individuals from the diaspora into the commission to ensure its success.

In building cultural capacity and diversity, Temitope Ajayi held the First Nigerian Valentine Dinner Party. Which, in addition to breaking bread and fraternizing with fellow Nigerians, students ranging from 12 to 25 years old received educational achievement and community service awards from several government officials. The Congresswoman Barbara Lee, Mayor of Oakland Jerry Brown, State Senator Don Perata, San Francisco Mayor Gavin Newsom, and several others, made these awards available to all the recipients.
When the First Lady of Nigeria died with 117 others in a plane crash in Nigeria in 2005, Temitope Ajayi held a memorial service in Oakland, California, which was attended by the Nigerian Consulate General of New York, Dr. F.R. Aderele.
In the most anticipated Nigeria Independence Day parade in New York City (October 2005), Temitope Ajayi was nominated a Marshall, along with the Permanent Representative to the Mission of Nigeria to the United Nations Ambassador Aminu Wali, Consular. General of the Nigeria, Dr. F.R. Aderele, the Deputy Permanent Ambassador to the Mission of Nigeria to the UN, Ambassador Adekanye, some State Governors from Nigeria and many other dignitaries.

Other non-profits 

Chief Ajayi is the Honorable Chair at the Global Connections for Women foundation (GC4W), an approved US non-profit organization that believes in all women and youth and their right to create new opportunities for themselves and their communities.
GC4W was founded by Lilian O. Ajayi, an International Speaker and the Global Ambassador of Hope.

Recognitions 

Chief Temitope Ajayi is the recipients of several high-profile international honours and awards:
For her service to African communities in the US, Chief Ajayi was awarded the President's Volunteer Service Award issued by President George W. Bush, which is a national prize under the patronage of the President of the United States recognizing voluntary engagement.

In 2013, Governor Mike Beebe conferred Honorary Citizenship of Arkansas State on Chief Ms. Temitope Ajayi alongside few other prominent Nigerians: Alhaji Aliko Dangote, President of Dangote Group; Governor Rabiu Kwankwaso of Kano State; Dr. Akinwunmi Adesina, Minister of Agriculture and Rural Development; Prof. Tajudeen Gbadamosi, a former lecturer of University of Lagos; Prof. Ade Adefuye, the Nigeria’s Ambassador to the United States; Prof. Julius Okojie, the Executive Secretary of the National Universities Commission; Mr. Robert Brunner, the Vice President America’s Arik Air International; and Mr. Kester Ifeadi, the Managing Director of Contemporary Group Ltd. 

She was appointed the Goodwill Ambassador for the state of Arkansas and Maryland by the Governor and Mayor respectively; and was awarded the "Key to the City" of Little Rock, Arkansas by Mayor Mark Stodola.
In 2014, Chief Temitope Ajayi was honoured alongside Nobel Peace Prize winner Leymah Gbowee, H.E. Ngozi Okonjo-Iweala (Nigeria’s Finance Minister) and many others by the Global Connection for Women (GC4W) in its 2014 International Women’s Day Awards Gala at the Harvard Club of New York.
Chief Temitope Ajayi was among the few Nigerians selected as part of Nigeria’s Success Stories in the Private Sector in Agriculture by the Corporate Council on Africa and the Embassy of the Federal Republic of Nigeria.
In her capacity as the then President of ANAC, Temitope Ajayi mobilized a Nigerian leadership coalition to challenge the false imagery of Nigerians in America as criminals, a documentary forecasted on CNN titled: How To Rob A Bank? After several dialogues, CNN representative apologized to the Nigerian Community for such false imagery of Nigerians in the United States. She received a Congressional award from Congresswoman Barbara Lee for her role. Chief Ajayi also received the "key to the city" of Dyersville, Iowa from the Mayor of the city, James Heavens, who also presented a proclamation affirming that every 16 July will be celebrated as "Nigerian Friendship Day". 

During the 2006 G8 United Nations World Summit, Temitope Ajayi, was invited by the Permanent Mission of Nigeria to the United Nations to serve as an advisor on Global and Pan-African Women issues. She received a Certificate of Commendation from the Board of Supervisors, Alameda County, California - USA. Also, Chief Ajayi received a “Woman of Distinction” Award given by the Foreign Investment Network with Global Trusted Alliances. The editor, Chido Nwangwu of US Africa Class Magazine named Chief Temitope Ajayi the "Mother of the Year", and Ebenezer Olayiwola of Events Worldwide Magazine named Chief Ajayi as one of the most influential Nigerians in the United States.

References

External links

 GC4WOMEN.ORG
 GC4WOMEN.ORG/NEWS
 The 2nd Annual GC4W AWARDS
 PRESIDENT JOYCE BANDA FOUNDATION

2014 in Nigeria
Living people
Year of birth missing (living people)
Businesspeople from Lagos
People from Lagos State
Nigerian emigrants to the United States
Yoruba women in business
Yoruba women philanthropists
American people of Yoruba descent
Nigerian accountants
Nigerian philanthropists
Nigerian women's rights activists
Yoruba women activists
Nigerian women in business
Nigerian nonprofit businesspeople
Nigerian social entrepreneurs
Nigerian diaspora in North America